Audun Erlien (born 22 February 1967 in Oslo, Norway) is a Norwegian jazz musician (bass guitar, guitar and electronica).

Erlienhas released one solo album, and is also active in a long list of other ensembles, such as Karl Seglem's Sogn-A-Song, Øystein Sevåg's Global House Band and Eivind Aarset's Sonic Codex Orchestra.

 As performer 

 Within «Some Like It Hot» 
1996: Mexico EP (Edel Records)
1996: Some Like It Hot (Edel Records)

 With Karl Seglem 
1997: Tya - frå Bor til Bytes (NorCD), with Reidar Skår
2004: New North (NorCD)
Within «Karl Seglem's Sogn-A-Song»
1990: Sogn-A-Song (NorCD)
1994: Rit (NorCD)
1998: Spir (NorCD), with Berit Opheim

 With Silje Nergaard 
1990: Tell Me Where You're Going (Lifetime Records)
1991: Silje (Princess Records/Lifetime Records)

 With Ketil Bjørnstad 
1991: Rift (Slager)

 With Bendik Hofseth 
1991: IX (Columbia Records)
1993: Amuse Yourself (Columbia Records)
1996: Planets, Rivers and...Ikea (Verve Forecast)
1998: Ligotage (ECM Records)
1999: Smilets historie (Sonet Gramofon), with additional Anders Engen, Eivind Aarset & Jan Bang
2009: XI (Grappa Music), with Olivier Louvel, Erlend Skomsvoll & Paolo Vinaccia

 With Jan Eggum 
1991: Underveis (Grappa Music)
1993: Nesten ikke tilstede (Grappa Music)
2001: Ekte Eggum (Grappa Music)
2005: 30/30 (Grappa Music)
2011: Kjærlighet og ærlighet 1 (Grappa Music)
2011: Kjærlighet og ærlighet 2 (Grappa Music)

 With Anja Garbarek 
1992: Velkommen inn (RCA, BMG Ariola)

 With Knut Reiersrud 
1993: Tramp (Kirkelig Kulturverksted)
1995: Klapp (Kirkelig Kulturverksted)
1998: Soul of a Man (Kirkelig Kulturverksted)
1999: Sub (Kirkelig Kulturverksted)
2001: Sweet Showers of Rain (Kirkelig Kulturverksted)
2004: Himalaya Blues (Kirkelig Kulturverksted)

 With Øystein Sevåg 
1993: Link (Windham Hill Records)
1999: Pearl Collection (Siddharta Records)
2005: Caravan (Siddhartha Records)
Within «Øystein Sevåg's Global House Band»
1995: Global House (Windham Hill Records)
2010: The Red Album (Siddhartha Spiritual Music)

 With Anne Grete Preus 
1997: Hvitt lys i natten (WEA)

 With Nils Petter Molvær 
2000: Solid Ether (ECM Records)
2001: Recoloured (ECM Records)
2002: NP3 (EmArcy Records)
2002: Live (Universal Music Norway), from Hamburg Jazzport Festival 2001
2004: Streamer (Sula Records)
2006: An American Compilation (Thirsty Ear Recordings)
2009: Hamada (Sula Records, Universal)

 With Folk & Røvere 
2000: Oslo (Sonet Grammofon)

 With Jacob Young 
2001: Glow (Curling Legs)

 With Vidar Busk 
2001: Venus Texas (Warner Music Norway)
2004: Love Buzz (Warner Music Norway)
2005: Starfish (Warner Music Norway)

 With Ole Paus 
2004: Klassefesten (Petroleum Records)
2004: En bøtte med lys (Petroleum Records)

 With Dhafer Youssef 
2006: Divine Shadows (Jazzland Records)
2008: Live at Cully Jazz Festival (Bootleg)

 With Eivind Aarset & The Sonic Codex Orchestra 
2007: Sonic Codex (Jazzland Records)
2010: Live Extracts (Jazzland Records)

 With Mathias Eick 
2008: The Door (ECM Records)
2010: Skala (ECM Records)

 With Jarle Bernhoft 
2008: Ceramik City Chronicles (Polydor Records/Universal Music Norway)
2010: 1: Man 2: Band (2010)
2011: Solidarity Breaks (Kikitepe Cassette)

 Within Johan Sara jr. Group 
2009: Orvos (Stierdna)

 With Mathias Eick 
2013: Skala (ECM Records)
2018: Ravensburg (ECM Records)

 With Elly 
2013: To Somewhere Peaceful (Elly Music)

 With Spirit In The Dark 
2016: Now Is The Time (Jazzland Recordings)

 With other projects 
1983 - Jahn Teigen: Harlequin (Polydor Records)
1983 - «Søstrene»: Chanson om Verdun1985 - Lars Martin Myhre & «Søstrene»: Bak speilet (Phonofile)
1989 - «Lydia»: Dia1991 - Danko/Fjeld/Andersen: Danko Fjeld Andersen (Mercury)
1992 - Deepika Thathaal: I alt slags lys (Kirkelig Kulturverksted)
1993 - Jonas Fjeld: Texas Jensen (Stageway Records)
1994 - Sissel Kyrkjebø: Innerst i sjelen (Mercury)
1994 - Frøydis Armand, Stein Mehren, Ketil Bjørnstad: For den som elsker (Kirkelig Kulturverksted)
1994 - Danko/Fjeld/Andersen: Ridin' on the Blinds (Grappa Music)
1994 - Anita Skorgan: Julenatt (Warner Music, Norway)
1995 - Vidar Johnsen: Cover Me (Phonofile)
1995 - Earl Wilson: Blues for All Seasons (EWP)
1997 - Ciwan Haco: Biluramin1997 - Liz Tove Vespestad: Blackout (Sonet Grammofon)

1998 - Carsten Loly: Dusk (The Orchard)
1998 - Alex Rosén: In Person (Universal)
1998 - Grethe Svensen: Catwalk (Kirkelig Kulturverksted)
1999 - Kristin Skaare: Amoramora (Kirkelig Kulturverksted)
1999 - Lars Lillo Stenberg: The Freak (Sonet Grammofon)
1999 - Jonas Fjeld: Voice on the Water (Norsk Plateproduksjon)
2000 - May Britt Haug: Smil og vær gal! (Musico)
2000 - Lars Lillo-Stenberg: Oslo (Sonet Grammofon)
2001 - Danko/Fjeld/Andersen: One More Shot (BMG Norway)
2001 - Siri Christensen: Secret Room (Not On Label)
2001 - Anita Skorgan: Gull (Kirkelig Kulturverksted)
2001 - Lisa Bonnar: Under himmelen (LBC Records)
2002 - State: State (Universal Records)
2003 - Patrick Shaw Iversen & Raymond C. Pellicer: On/Off (Jazzland Records)
2003 - Michy Mano & Bugge Wesseltoft: The Cool Side of the Pillow (Enja Records)
2006 - Lars Lillo-Stenberg: Lars Lillo Stenberg synger Prøysen (2006)
2007 - Anne Grete Preus: Om igjen for første gang (2007)
2007 - Magnar Birkeland: Min elskede kom hjem igår2007 - Mahsa Vahdat & Marjan Vahdat: Songs From a Persian Garden (Kirkelig Kulturverksted)
2008 - Kaia Huuse: Episoder2008 - Ronnie Jacobsen: Stand Your Test in Judgement2008 - Linn Skåber & Jacob Young: Magiske kroker & hemmeligheter2010 - Unni Wilhelmsen: Delirium Park2010 - Unni Wilhelmsen: 72011 - Luca Aquino: Chiara2011 - Carsten Lindholm: Tribute2011 - Anette Askvik: Liberty With various artists 
Tribut albums
1991: Buicken – store gutter gråter ikke (1991)
1994: Med blanke ark (1994)
1994: The Sweet Sunny North - Henry Kaiser & David Lindley in Norway (1994)
1999:  (Oh No!)
2001: Inn fra kulda - Bob Marley på norsk (2001)
2005:  (2005)

Compilations and sampler records
2000: Suite for Sampler - ECM Selected Signs II (ECM Records)
2002: Verve Today 2002 (Verve)
2002: Stolpesko (Warner Music Norway)
2003: Nu Jazz (2003)
2004: Lullabies From the Axis of Evil (Kirkelig Kulturverksted)
2006 - Diverse artister: Verve Today 2006 (Verve)
2008: Songs Across of Separation
2009: Verve Today 2009 (Verve)
2010: Barnas supershow - Hytta vår

 As producer 
2006 - Trond Granlund: Kommer tid, kommer råd (TG Records)
2012 - Hilde Heltberg: Elske det umulige - en samling av de beste sangene'' (Norskamerikaner), compilation

See also 

Curling Legs
NorCD

References

General

 

 

Specific

Jazz discographies
Discographies of Norwegian artists